Matthew A. Wand is an American attorney and Republican politician who was a member of the Oregon House of Representatives from 2011 until 2013. He represented the 49th District which covers all or part of the cities of Troutdale, Gresham, Fairview, and Wood Village. Prior to his term in the legislature, he served on the Troutdale City Council from 2008 until 2011.

Wand was elected to the legislature in 2010, defeating incumbent Democrat Nick Kahl, receiving 8,967 votes (53%) to Kahl's 7,857 votes (47%). He was defeated in his bid for reelection in 2012, receiving 9,602 votes (46%) to Chris Gorsek's 11,459 votes (54%).

Wand was criticized in 2012 for operating a Twitter account in which he followed several Playboy Playmates as well as other female actors and models. He then proceeded to take the account down.

See also
 76th Oregon Legislative Assembly

References

Year of birth missing (living people)
People from Gresham, Oregon
Republican Party members of the Oregon House of Representatives
Oregon lawyers
Living people
Portland State University alumni
Oregon city council members
People from Troutdale, Oregon
21st-century American politicians